Henry Thomas Ashton Froud (16 November 1898 – 7 February 1951) was an Australian rules footballer who played with South Melbourne in the Victorian Football League (VFL).

Notes

External links 

1898 births
1951 deaths
Australian rules footballers from Victoria (Australia)
Sydney Swans players